Lost in Oz is an American animated series that premiered in full on August 7, 2017 streaming on Amazon Prime Video. Originally part of a pilot program, the pilot episode was later re-released as Lost in Oz: Extended Adventure on November 2, 2016, combining the first three episodes. The full series was released later.

Synopsis
Dorothy Gale is a precocious child who, with her dog Toto, is swept up to the Land of Oz without a clear way home. To travel back, Dorothy must collect all the different types of magical elements with her newfound friends, the streetwise witch West and friendly Munchkin Ojo, while a sinister plot unfolds around them. (Episodes 1–13)

Dorothy and Toto, working together with their friends, must find their way out of the Deadly Desert and save Emerald City from the Nome Kingdom to have any chance of getting back to Kansas. (Episodes 14–26)

Cast

 Ashley Boettcher as Dorothy Gale
 Nika Futterman as West
 Jorge Diaz as Ojo
 Chris Cox as Toto
 Alexander Polinsky as Fitz
 Keith Ferguson as Reigh the Cowardly Lion
 Stephen Stanton as Scarecrow
 Gina Gershon as Langwidere
 Jennifer Hale as Glinda the Good Witch
 Allison Mack (originally season 1) and Grey DeLisle as Evelyn, Dorothy's mother
 Garrett McQuaid as Nome King
 Eric Bauza as Kaliko
 Bumper Robinson as Smith and Tinker
 Kath Soucie as Cyra
 Fred Tatasciore as General Guph

Episodes

Season 1 (2015–2017)

Season 2 (2018)

Awards
At the 44th Daytime Creative Arts Emmy Awards, the series won Outstanding Children's Animated Program, Outstanding Sound Editing - Animation, Outstanding Sound Mixing - Animation, and was nominated for Outstanding Writing in an Animated Program, and Outstanding Casting for an Animated Series or Special.

Notes

References

External links

2010s American animated television series
2017 American television series debuts
2018 American television series endings
Amazon Prime Video children's programming
Amazon Prime Video original programming
Television series by Amazon Studios
Animated television series by Amazon Studios
American children's animated adventure television series
American children's animated fantasy television series
American computer-animated television series
American television shows based on children's books
Animated television series about orphans
Animated television series about dogs
Animated television series about lions
Animated television series based on The Wizard of Oz
English-language television shows